Sheila Amos (July 27, 1946 – July 11, 2010) was an American film editor notable for her work on the shows Cheers and Frasier, and on the film The Thing About My Folks.
Amos was nominated for two Primetime Emmys during her career.

Death 
Amos died on July 11, 2010, in New York City from leukaemia at the age of 63.

Filmography 
The Thing About My Folks (2005)

External links 

1947 births
2010 deaths
American film editors
Deaths from leukemia
Deaths from cancer in New York (state)